Bhagya Chakramu is a 1968 Telugu-language film, directed by K. V. Reddy, and produced by P. S. Reddy under the Jayanthi Pictures banner. It stars N. T. Rama Rao snd B. Saroja Devi, with music composed by Pendyala Nageswara Rao.

Plot 
Once upon a time, there was a kingdom Narendrapura. Its king Dharmapala Maharaja (Mudigonda Lingamurthy) is a widower and living for the sake of his only daughter. Karkataka (Rajanala) is a snake charmer who ploys to make his sister Nagamma (Surabhi Balasaraswathi), the wife of the king. So, he secretly enters into the palace takes the mud from the footsteps of the princess, and makes the snake bite her. Then Karkataka enters as a saint and makes a condition to save the princess that the king should marry his sister. Between two fires, the King accepts and marries Nagamma but neglects her. So, Karkataka prepares a paste by the name of Kamakaleekam and applies it to the king which makes him a henpeck of Nagamma. Karkataka also mesmerizes the public and makes them believe him as a messenger of God by the name Swamy Raju.

Meanwhile, Nagamma is too blessed with a daughter, according to astrologers' prediction the elder daughter will marry an emperor while the younger ones to a person like an emperor. Nagamma is begrudged about it, so, Karkataka orders his henchmen to knock out the elder daughter. They kidnap her and are in a forest trying to kill her when a robber Gandragouli (Mukkamala) rescues and rears her. Years roll by, the princess grows up as Papa (B. Saroja Devi). In the fort, Swamy Raju is enjoying power and the king became a puppet.

Vikram (N. T. Rama Rao), the prince of Udayagiri once visits the forest for hunting, where he gets acquainted with Papa and they fall in love which Gandragouli objects to as he does not have a good impression on kings. So, Vikram decides to settle the issue through his mother, so, immediately, he moves to his kingdom. Meanwhile, Swamy Raju's men who are on the hunt for beautiful girls kidnap Papa by injuring Gandragoli. Then, Gandragoli notices a belt of the soldier, he suspects Vikram and reaches him.

Eventually, Nagamma decides to fix her daughter Chitravati's (Geetanjali) alliance with Vikram, so she sends their chief minister as a messenger to invite Vikram who recognizes the soldier's belt. Now Vikram understands Papa is under the custody of Swamy Raju. Here Vikram plans to send his friend Mitralabham (Padmanabham) in his place, he lands in disguise as Ashada Bhuti and joins Swamy Raju. Thereafter, Vikram makes many plans, finds out the location of Papa, and also learns that she is the elder daughter of Dharmapala. Simultaneously, he knows, that to make Dharmapala normal an antidote is required. At last, with the help of Papa, he achieves it and eliminates Swamy Raju. Finally, the movie ends on a happy note with the marriage of Vikram and Papa.

Cast 
N. T. Rama Rao as Vikram
B. Saroja Devi as Papa
Rajanala as Swamy Raja
Padmanabham as Mitralabham
Mukkamala as Gandragoli
Mudigonda Lingamurthy as Dharmapala Maharaju
Chalam
Peketi Sivaram
P. J. Sarma
Jagga Rao
Geetanjali as Chitravathi
Surabhi Balasaraswathi as Nagamma
Rushyendramani
Jyothi Lakshmi

Soundtrack 
Music composed by Pendyala Nageswara Rao. Lyrics were written by Pingali Nagendra Rao.

References

External links 
 

1960s Telugu-language films
Films based on Indian folklore
Films directed by K. V. Reddy
Films scored by Pendyala Nageswara Rao